Simone Scuffet (born 31 May 1996) is an Italian professional footballer who plays as a goalkeeper for Romanian Liga I side CFR Cluj.

Club career

Udinese
An Udinese youth product, Scuffet made his first team debut on 1 February 2014 at the age of 17 in a Serie A match against Bologna, as a replacement for injured Željko Brkić. After a string of impressive performances, he was subsequently promoted as first choice keeper, relegating Brkić on the bench.

On 9 June 2014, following a successful debut season, Scuffet signed a new five-year deal with the club. He failed to get the same level of game time during the 2014–15 season with Orestis Karnezis preferred as the first-choice goalkeeper at Udinese. On 8 December 2014, he Scuffet was named at the #1 spot in the goalkeepers category as part of Outside of the Boots 100 Best Young Players to Watch in 2015 feature. On 16 December 2014, he was named at the #1 spot as FutbolSapiens's 10 Best Young Goalkeepers of the Year feature.

Loan to Como
On 6 August 2015, Scuffet was sent out on loan to Serie B side Como. Although he was able to obtain more playing time at Como, he endured a negative season with the club, as he conceded 52 goals, while Como finished in last place in the league and were relegated to Lega Pro at the end of the 2015–16 Serie B season.

Loan to Kasımpaşa
On 16 January 2019, Scuffet joined Turkish side Kasımpaşa on loan until 30 June.

Loan to Spezia
On 19 August 2019, Scuffet joined Serie B club Spezia on loan until 30 June 2020 with an option to buy. He was the starting goalkeeper throughout the season, which ended with the club achieving promotion to Serie A.

Return to Udinese
In July 2020, Scuffet returned to Udinese. On 28 October, he returned between the sticks for the club, playing as a starter in the Italian Cup match against Vicenza, which finished in a 3–1 win. On 2 May 2021, due to a suspension of starting goalkeeper Juan Musso, he returned to Serie A action for the 2–1 defeat against Juventus in which he conceded two goals to Cristiano Ronaldo.

APOEL
On 30 August 2021, Scuffet signed a two-year contract with Cypriot First Division club APOEL.

CFR Cluj
On 17 July 2022, Scuffet joined Romanian Liga I champions CFR Cluj on a free transfer.

International career
Scuffet has represented Italy U-17 team at both the 2013 UEFA European Under-17 Championship – where they reached the final – and the 2013 FIFA U-17 World Cup, where they were eliminated in the round of 16 by Mexico.

In March and in April 2014 he was called up by Italy senior coach Cesare Prandelli to join two training camps ahead of the 2014 World Cup.

He made his first appearance for the Italy U-21 team on 12 August 2015, in a friendly match against Hungary. In June 2017, he was included in the Italy under-21 squad for the 2017 UEFA European Under-21 Championship by manager Luigi Di Biagio.

Style of play
Scuffet has earned praise in the media for his reflexes, confidence, consistency, calm composure, leadership qualities, and precocious performances as a youngster, which have earned him comparisons with former Italy national football team goalkeeper and 2006 World Cup winner Gianluigi Buffon, who also made his Serie A debut as a teenager. Regarded as one of the most promising young players of his generation, in 2014 Don Balón listed him as one of the top 100 young players in the world. His ability to come out off his line and his confidence when handling crosses and high balls have been cited as areas for improvement by pundits, however.

Career statistics

Honours

InternationalItaly U17' 
 UEFA European Under-17 Championship runner-up: 2013

References

Living people
1996 births
Sportspeople from Udine
Footballers from Friuli Venezia Giulia
Association football goalkeepers
Italian footballers
Italy under-21 international footballers
Italy youth international footballers
Italian expatriate footballers
Udinese Calcio players
Como 1907 players
Kasımpaşa S.K. footballers
Spezia Calcio players
APOEL FC players
CFR Cluj players
Serie A players
Serie B players
Süper Lig players
Liga I players
Cypriot First Division players
Expatriate footballers in Turkey
Expatriate footballers in Cyprus
Italian expatriate sportspeople in Turkey
Italian expatriate sportspeople in Cyprus
Italian expatriate sportspeople in Romania